Pyotr Kuznetsov (born 1964) is the leader and founder of the Russian religious group, the True Russian Orthodox Church. Kuznetsov did not let his followers watch television, listen to the radio or handle money. The group has been referred to as a "Doomsday cult".

Kuznetsov is a divorced architect from Belarus, who wandered all across Russia to spread his message of the impending apocalypse before settling in the village of Nikolskoye. He has been diagnosed as schizophrenic, and according to The Guardian, he sleeps in a coffin.

On April 3, 2008, Kuznetsov attempted suicide when he was taken to a hospital where "Officials said that he may have attempted suicide after realising his prediction had been wrong."

References

External links 

 Stench of rotting corpses drives Russian doomsday group from cave on Wikinews

Living people
1964 births
20th-century apocalypticists
21st-century apocalypticists
Founders of new religious movements
People with schizophrenia